For Bread Alone (Arabic: Al-khubz al-hafi) is one of the most famous literary works by the writer Mohammed Choukri, and the most controversial. It was written in Arabic in 1972 and translated into English by Paul Bowles in 1973. In 1980 it was published in French as Le Pain Nu in a translation by Tahar Ben Jelloun. It was not published in Arabic until 1982, because of controversy engendered by its unusual boldness. The novel has been translated into 39 foreign languages, as well as a graphic novel version (in French) by Moroccan comic artist Abdelaziz Mouride.

Content

Family
The novel relates the tragedy of a person whose circumstances forced him to remain in the darkness of illiteracy until he reached the age of twenty. His youth was a drift in the world of misery, where violence alone strengthened the daily exiles. All of that happened in a crushed environment under the pressure of colonialism and the spread of poverty, hunger, ignorance, and epidemics, where eating from trash bins and sorcery rituals such as the drinking of blood with the intention of healing. The mother of the protagonist used to resort to the "shawafat" and light candles on the tombs of the saints with the intention of becoming closer to God so that her husband would come out. His mother was forced to sell vegetables and fruits in the city's markets, while Shukri was subsisting from the trash bins of the rich Christian Europeans, not the trash bins of the Muslim Moroccans, which were poor, according to him. Through it, the boy coexisted with morally bad individuals and groups. The protagonist in the novel grew up in a family in which the role of the father was unjust and cruel, taking snuff and cursing God. The violence in which the son grew up around, leads to his spiritual, moral, and ethical destruction, and makes him reject the traditional family system, in which the father is positioned at the top. By doing so, the writer seeks to destroy the father's symbolic position, and destroy his authority, which is the cause of his misery. He felt dissatisfied with his mother's laughter with his father. "Damn all fathers if they are like my father." "I hate people who look like my father." His intense hatred for his father prompted him to replace his patriarchal society with a feminine one, and a tendency for violence and revenge was born, "in my imagination, I don't remember how many times I killed him." When his father was beaten in front of him, this scene was a consolation for him.

Tangiers 
He fled the countryside to Tangier, encountering foreigners, prostitution, and drugs and living in the underworld. The narrator chased women throughout his life, starting with bestiality, passing through Asia, Fatima, Sulafa, and the prostitutes. He lived his life in this manner to the extent that he becomes a professional prostitute. Shukri came to the city by force and not by choice, while his father was on the run from Franco's army, and he was arrested and imprisoned for two years, which he spent between Tangier and Asilah. In the port of Tangiers, Shukri sold cigarettes and drugs to foreigners and was leading American soldiers to European brothels.

Publication history 
"For Bread Alone" is the first part of Choukri's autobiography that consisted of his three most important works. In addition to this novel, there is "Time of mistakes" and "Faces". The writer said that the idea of an autobiography came from his American writer friend Paul Bowles who resides in Tangier, and he sold it orally before he actually started writing it. Tahar Ben Jellon has translated For Bread Alone into French and it was published by Maspero publishing house. The book was welcomed positively among readers and critics. The book stayed hidden for twenty years before it got published by the writer himself in Arabic in Morocco. After that, the book entered the modern Arab literary fabric, where great admiration met with rejection, repression, and prevention so that the story of the book prevailed over the book itself. This work sparked an uproar and was banned in most Arab countries, as its critics considered it bold in a way that does not conform to the traditions of Arab societies. The book is still banned or almost banned in most Arab countries.

Title

For the Arab reader, the title of this novel refers to subsistence life, because bread is not intended in itself. However, the writer's friend, novelist Tahar Ben Jelloun, chose to translate Shukri's title with an intermediate title for the Francophone reader: (French: "Le Pain Nu"), meaning "naked bread". "Bread," as Tahar Ben jellon sees it through his French title, may be a "meal alone."

Cinema 
In 2004, Algerian director Rachid Ben haj transferred the novel to the cinema in a film of the same name: For bread Alone.

References 

1982 novels
20th-century Moroccan novels
Arabic-language novels